This article gives an overview of liberalism and the historical radicalism movement within liberalism in Switzerland. It is limited to liberal and radical parties with substantial support, mainly proved by having had a representation in parliament. The sign ⇒ means a reference to another party in that scheme. For inclusion in this scheme it isn't necessary that parties labeled themselves as a liberal party.

Introduction
In the nineteenth century the radicalism of Freisinn became the dominant political force in Switzerland, which remained for a long time in the twentieth century. Both the major Free Democratic Party of Switzerland (Freisinnig-Demokratische Partei der Schweiz/Parti Radical-Démocratique Suisse, member LI, ELDR) and the minor Liberal Party of Switzerland (Liberale Partei der Schweiz/Parti Libéral Suisse, member LI) were right-of-center liberal parties that merged into FDP.The Liberals (FDP.Die Liberalen/PLR.Les Libéraux-Radicaux, observer LI, member ALDE) in 2009.

Timeline

Regeneration

From Liberal Democrats to Liberal Party of Switzerland
 1893: The moderate liberals established the Liberal Democrats (Liberaldemokraten), but most German-speaking liberals joined in 1894 the ⇒ Free Democratic Party of Switzerland
 1913: The party is renamed Liberal Democratic Party (Liberaldemokratische Partei)
 1961: The party is reorganised into the Liberal Democratic Union of Switzerland (Liberaldemokratische Union der Schweiz)
 1977: The party is renamed Liberal Party of Switzerland (Liberale Partei der Schweiz/Parti Libéral Suisse)

Free Democratic Party of Switzerland
 1894: The Radicals (Freisinn in German) became a dominant factor in Swiss politics and established as a party the Free Democratic Party of Switzerland (Freisinnig-Demokratische Partei der Schweiz/Parti Radical-Démocratique Suisse)
 1896: A faction formed the ⇒ Extreme Left
 1918: A conservative faction of the party seceded as the Farmers', Traders' and Citizens' Party
 1941: The Zürich branch joined the ⇒ Democratic Party of Switzerland
 1971: The Zürich branch of the ⇒ Democratic Party of Switzerland rejoined the party

From Extreme Left to Democratic Party of Switzerland
 1896: The left wing of the ⇒ Free Democratic Party of Switzerland established the Extreme Left (Äußerste Linke)
 1905: The Extreme Left organised itself as the social liberal Democratic Party of Switzerland (Demokratische Partei der Schweiz)
 1941: A Zürich faction of the ⇒ Free Democratic Party of Switzerland joined the party
 1971: The Zürich branch of the party returned to the ⇒ Free Democratic Party of Switzerland, while the Glarus and Grisons branches merged into the Swiss People's Party

Ring of Independents
 1936: Gottlieb Duttweiler formed the Ring of Independents as a social-liberal party
 1999: The party disbanded

Liberal leaders
 Freisinn: Ludwig Snell - Alfred Escher

References

See also
 History of Switzerland
 Politics of Switzerland
 List of political parties in Switzerland

Politics of Switzerland
Liberalism and radicalism by country